The 1978 Baldwin–Wallace Yellow Jackets football team was an American football team that represented Baldwin–Wallace University as a member of the Ohio Athletic Conference (OAC) during the 1978 NCAA Division III football season. The team compiled an undefeated season and was the NCAA Division III national champion.

Season overview
In their 21st season under head coach Lee Tressel, the Flyers compiled an 11–0–1 record, the tie (17–17) coming in the OAC championship game on the road against .

The Division III championship was decided in the 1978 Amos Alonzo Stagg Bowl featuring a rematch of OAC co-champions Baldwin-Wallace and Wittenberg. After playing to a tie in the conference championship game, Baldwin-Wallace dominated in the Stagg Bowl, winning by a 24–10 score.

The team played its home games at George Finnie Stadium in Berea, Ohio.

Awards and honors
In voting by the OAC coaches, Baldwin Wallace tackle Paul Petrella won the Hank Critchfield Award as the best defensive lineman in the conference. Fullback Roger "Amtrack" Andrachik (a Yale transfer) tied with Wittenberg's Dave Merritt in the balloting for the Mike Gregory Award as the OAC's best offensive back.

Nine Baldwin-Wallace players received first-team honors on the All-OAC team: quarterback Joe Surniak; fullback Roger Andrachik; offensive tackle Jeff Jenkins; punter Doug Schiefer; linebacker Bill Rickert; defensive down linemen Bill Davis and Paul Petrella; linebacker Gary Monda; and defensive back Gary Stelter.

After the season, coach Tressel was honored by the American Football Coaches Association (AFCA) as the college division coach of the year. Tressel was inducted into the College Football Hall of Fame in 1996.

In October 2018, the 1978 team was inducted as a group into the Baldwin Wallace Athletics Hall of Fame.

Schedule

References

Baldwin–Wallace
Baldwin Wallace Yellow Jackets football seasons
NCAA Division III Football Champions
College football undefeated seasons
Baldwin Wallace–Yellow Jackets football